Ilian Kaziyski (born 9 August 1960) is a Bulgarian volleyball player. He competed in the men's tournament at the 1988 Summer Olympics.

References

1960 births
Living people
Bulgarian men's volleyball players
Olympic volleyball players of Bulgaria
Volleyball players at the 1988 Summer Olympics
Sportspeople from Sofia